The history of the Jews in Scotland goes back to at least the 17th century. It is not known when Jews first arrived in Scotland, with the earliest concrete historical references to a Jewish presence in Scotland being from the late 17th century. Most  Scottish Jews today are of Ashkenazi background who mainly settled in Edinburgh, then in Glasgow in the mid 19th century. In 2013 the Edinburgh Jewish Studies Network curated an online exhibition based on archival holdings and maps in the National Library of Scotland exploring the influence of the community on the city.   

According to the 2011 census, 5,887 Jews lived in Scotland; a decline of 8.7% from the 2001 census. The total population of Scotland at the time was 5,313,600, making Scottish Jews 0.1% of the population.

Middle Ages to union with England
There is only scant evidence of a Jewish presence in medieval Scotland. In 1180, the Bishop of Glasgow forbade churchmen to "ledge their benefices for money borrowed from Jews". This was around the time of anti-Jewish riots in England so it is possible that Jews may have arrived in Scotland as refugees, or it may refer to Jews domiciled in England from whom Scots were borrowing money.

In the Middle Ages, much of Scotland's trade was with continental Europe, with wool of the Borders abbeys being the country's main export to Flanders and the Low Countries. Scottish merchants from Aberdeen and Dundee had close trading links to Baltic ports in Poland and Lithuania. It is possible, therefore, that Jews may have come to Scotland to do business with their Scottish counterparts, although no direct evidence of this exists.

The late-18th-century author Henry Mackenzie speculated that the high incidence of biblical place names around the village of Morningside near Edinburgh might indicate that Jews had settled in the area during the Middle Ages. This belief has, however, been shown to be incorrect, with the names originating instead from the presence of a local farm named "Egypt" mentioned in historical documents from the 16th century and believed to indicate a Romani presence.

17th–19th centuries

The first recorded Jew in Edinburgh was one David Brown who made a successful application to reside and trade in the city in 1691.

Most Jewish immigration appears to have occurred post-industrialisation, and post-1707, by which time Jews in Scotland were subject to various anti-Jewish laws that applied to Britain as a whole. Oliver Cromwell readmitted Jews to the Commonwealth of England in 1656, and would have had influence over whether they could reside north of the border. Scotland was under the jurisdiction of the Jew Bill, enacted in 1753, but repealed the next year. It has been theorised that some Jews who arrived in Scotland promptly assimilated, with some converting to Christianity.

The first graduate from the University of Glasgow who was openly known to be Jewish was Levi Myers, in 1787. Unlike their English contemporaries, Scottish students were not required to take a religious oath. In 1795, Herman Lyon, a dentist and chiropodist, bought a burial plot in Edinburgh. Originally from Mogendorf, Germany he left there around 1764 and spent some time in Holland before arriving in London. He moved to Scotland in 1788. The presence of the plot on Calton Hill is no longer obvious today, but it is marked on the Ordnance Survey map of 1852 as "Jew's Burial vault".

The first Jewish congregation in Edinburgh was founded in 1817, when the Edinburgh community consisted of 20 families. The first congregation in Glasgow was founded in 1821, and that of Aberdeen was founded in 1893. The Jewish cemetery in Dundee indicates that there has been a Jewish congregation in that city since the 19th century. Much of the first influx of Jews to Scotland were Dutch and German merchants attracted to the commercial economies of Scottish cities.

Isaac Cohen, a hatter resident in Glasgow, was admitted a burgess of the city on 22 September 1812. The first interment in the Glasgow Necropolis was that of Joseph Levi, a quill merchant and cholera victim who was buried there on 12 September 1832. This occurred in the year before the formal opening of the burial ground, a part of it having been sold to the Jewish community beforehand for one hundred guineas. Glasgow-born Asher Asher (1837–1889) was the first Scottish Jew to enter the medical profession. He was the author of The Jewish Rite of Circumcision (1873).

The story of his own family's experience was immortalised in Jack Ronder's book & TV series called The Lost Tribe, starring Miriam Margolyes & Bill Paterson.

In 1878, Jewish Hannah de Rothschild (1851–1890), the richest woman in Britain at the time, married Scottish aristocrat Archibald Primrose, 5th Earl of Rosebery, despite strong antisemitic sentiments in court and the aristocracy. They had four children. Their son, Harry, would become Secretary of State for Scotland in 1945 during Winston Churchill's postwar caretaker government.

To avoid persecution and pogroms in the Russian Empire in the 1880s, many Jews settled in the larger cities of Britain, including Scotland, most notably in Glasgow (especially the poorer part of the city, the Gorbals, alongside Irish and Italian immigrants). A smaller community existed in Edinburgh and even smaller groups in Dundee, Aberdeen, Greenock and Ayr. Russian Jews tended to come from the west of the empire, in particular Lithuania and Poland, many using Scotland as a stopping post en route to North America. This explains why Glasgow was their favoured location. However, those who were not able to earn enough to afford the transatlantic voyage ended up settling in the city. In 1897, after the influx, the Jewish population of Glasgow was 6,500.

This second influx of Jews was notably larger than the first, and came from Eastern Europe as opposed to Western European countries like Germany and the Netherlands. This led to the informal distinction between the Westjuden, who tended to be middle class and assimilated into Scottish society, and the much bigger Ostjuden community, consisting of poor Yiddish-speakers who fled pogroms in Eastern Europe. While the Westjuden had settled in more affluent areas, such as Garnethill in Glasgow (where a synagogue was built in 1879), the Ostjuden settled in slums in the Gorbals, and by 1901 the Jewish population of Scotland had increased to 9,000.

20th and 21st centuries

Immigration continued into the 20th century, with over 9,000 Jews in 1901 and around 12,000 in 1911. Jewish life in the Gorbals in Glasgow initially mirrored that of traditional shtetl life; however, concerns around this being a contributing factor to a rise in anti-semitism led to the established Jewish community establishing various philanthropic and welfare organisations with the goals of offering assistance to the refugees, including support in assimilating into Scottish society. The passing of the Aliens Act 1905 and the onset of World War I led to a substantial decrease in the number of Jewish refugees arriving in Scotland.

Refugees from Nazi Germany and the Second World War further augmented the Scottish Jewish community, which has been estimated to have reached over 20,000 in the mid-20th century. By way of comparison, the Jewish population in the United Kingdom peaked at 500,000, but declined to just over half that number by 2008.

The practising Jewish population continues to fall in Scotland, as many younger Jews either became secular, or intermarried with other faiths. Scottish Jews have also emigrated in large numbers to England, the United States, Israel, Canada, Australia and New Zealand for economic reasons, as other Scots have done. According to the 2001 census, 6,448 Jews lived in Scotland, According to the 2011 census, 5,887 Jews lived in Scotland; a decline of 8.7% from 2001. 41% (2,399) of Scottish Jews live in the small area of East Renfrewshire, making up 2.65% of the population there. 25% of Scottish Jews live in the East Renfrewshire town of Newton Mearns alone. Many Jewish families slowly moved southwards to more prosperous areas, from the neighbouring city of Glasgow over the generations. Glasgow itself has 897 Jews (15% of the Jewish population) living there, whilst Edinburgh has 855 (also 15%). The area with the least Jewish people was the Outer Hebrides, which reported just 3 Jews (0.05%) living there.

In March 2008 a Jewish tartan was designed by Brian Wilton for Chabad rabbi Mendel Jacobs of Glasgow and certified by the Scottish Tartans Authority. The tartan's colors are blue, white, silver, red and gold. According to Jacobs: "The blue and white represent the colours of the Scottish and Israeli flags, with the central gold line representing the gold from the Biblical Tabernacle, the Ark of the Covenant and the many ceremonial vessels ... the silver is from the decorations that adorn the Scroll of Law and the red represents the traditional red Kiddush wine."

Jewish communities in Scotland are represented by the Scottish Council of Jewish Communities.

Historic antisemitism

In the Middle Ages, while Jews in England faced state persecution, culminating in the Edict of Expulsion of 1290 (some Jews may have moved to Scotland at this time) there was never a corresponding expulsion from Scotland, suggesting either greater religious tolerance or the simple fact that there was no Jewish presence. In his autobiographical, Two Worlds: An Edinburgh Jewish Childhood, the eminent Scottish-Jewish scholar David Daiches wrote that there are grounds for asserting that Scotland is the only European country with no history of state persecution of Jews.

Modern antisemitism 
Some elements of the British Union of Fascists formed in 1932 were anti-Jewish and Alexander Raven Thomson, one of its main ideologues, was a Scot. Blackshirt meetings were physically attacked in Edinburgh by communists and "Protestant Action", which believed the group to be an Italian (i.e. Roman Catholic) intrusion. In fact, William Kenefick of Dundee University has claimed that bigotry was diverted away from Jews by anti-Catholicism, particularly in Glasgow where the main ethnic chauvinist agitation was against Irish Catholics. Archibald Maule Ramsay, a Scottish Unionist MP claimed that World War II was a "Jewish war" and was the only MP in the UK interned under Defence Regulation 18B. In the Gorbals at least, neither Louise Sless nor Woolf Silver recall antisemitic sentiment. (See also Jews escaping from Nazi Europe to Britain.) As a result of rising anti-semitism in the United Kingdom by the 1930s, Jewish leadership bodies including the Glasgow Jewish Representative Council adopted a position of trying to prevent drawing attention to the city's Jewish population, such as through the promotion of assimilation. This was in line with the national leadership at the Board of Deputies of British Jews, although the Edinburgh Jewish Representative Council was notably more active and visible in its campaigning for support to be offered to German Jews.

In 2012, the Scottish Jewish Student Chaplaincy and the Scottish Council of Jewish Communities reported a "toxic atmosphere" at the University of Edinburgh, in which Jewish students were forced to hide their identity.

In September 2013, the Scottish Council of Jewish Communities published the "Being Jewish in Scotland" project, which researched the situation of Jewish people in Scotland through interviews and focus group attended by approximately 180 participants. The report included data from the Community Security Trust that, during 2011, there were 10 antisemitic incidents of abusive behaviour, 9 incidents of damage and desecration to Jewish property, and one assault. Some participants described experiences of antisemitism in their workplace, campus and at school.

During the Operation Protective Edge, in August 2014, the Scottish Council of Jewish Communities reported a sharp increase in antisemitic incidents. During the first week of August, there were 12 antisemitic incidents – almost as many as in the whole of 2013. A few months later, an irritating chemical was thrown on a member of staff selling Kedem (Israeli cosmetics) products in Glasgow's St Enoch Centre. In 2015, the Scottish government published statistics on abusive behaviour in Religiously Aggravated Offending in Scotland in 2014–15, covering the Protective Edge period, which noted an increase in the number of charges filed for anti-Jewish acts from 9 in 2014 (2% of those charged with religious offences) to 25 in 2015 (4% of total). Most dealt with "threatening and abusive behavior" and "offensive communications". The penalty imposed on those convicted was typically a fine.

Anti-semitism continues to be a topic of political debate in Scotland. In 2017 the Scottish Government formally adopted the International Holocaust Remembrance Alliance’s (IHRA) definition of anti-Semitism.

"Scots-Yiddish"

Scots-Yiddish is the name given to a Jewish hybrid vernacular between Lowland Scots and Yiddish, which had a brief currency in the Lowlands in the first half of the 20th century. The Scottish literary historian David Daiches describes it in his autobiographical account of his Edinburgh Jewish childhood, Two Worlds.

Daiches explores the social stratification of Edinburgh's Jewish society in the interwar period, noting what is effectively a class divide between two parts of the community, on the one hand a highly educated and well-integrated group who sought a synthesis of Orthodox Rabbinical and modern secular thinking, on the other a Yiddish-speaking group most comfortable maintaining the lifestyle of the Eastern European ghetto. The Yiddish-speaking population grew up in Scotland in the 19th century, but by the late 20th century had mostly switched to using English. The creolisation of Yiddish with Scots was therefore a phenomenon of the middle part of this period.

The Glaswegian Jewish poet A C Jacobs also refers to his language as Scots-Yiddish. There was even a case of a Jewish immigrant who settled in the Highlands who spoke no English and was only able to speak Gaelic and Yiddish.

List of Scottish Jews

 Ronni Ancona, comedian
Jenni Calder, writer
 Hazel, Lady Cosgrove first female Court of Session judge
 Ivor Cutler, musician, teacher and comedian
 Noam Dar, professional wrestler
 Sir Monty Finniston, industrialist
 Isla Fisher, ethnically Scottish, but converted to Judaism as an adult
 Hannah Frank, artist and sculptor
 Myer Lord Galpern MP, Lord Provost of Glasgow
 Ralph Glasser, psychologist and economist (born in Leeds but grew up in Glasgow)
 Professor Sir Abraham Goldberg KB MD DSc FRCP FRSE, leading medical academic
 Muriel Gray, author and presenter of The Tube
 Jeremy Isaacs, broadcaster, who wasborn in Glasgow from what were described as "Scottish Jewish roots".
A C Jacobs, poet
 Mark Knopfler, Dire Straits co-founder, lead vocalist and lead guitarist
 Kevin Macdonald, director, known for Touching the Void
 Isi Metzstein, architect
 Saul Metzstein, filmmaker
Neil Primrose, MP and soldier, who had a Jewish mother, Hannah de Rothschild
 Malcolm Rifkind, politician
Hugo Rifkind, broadcaster
Harry Primrose, 6th Earl of Rosebery, Secretary of State for Scotland, Jewish mother
 Jerry Sadowitz, controversial comedian and conjurer
 Benno Schotz, sculptor
Sara Sheridan, writer
 Manny Shinwell, politician
 J. David Simons, novelist
 Dame Muriel Spark, novelist
 Harry, Lord Woolf, judge, brought up and educated in Scotland
 Scottie Wilson, artist

See also

 History of the Jews in Ireland
 History of the Jews in Wales
 History of the Jews in England
The Scottish Council of Jewish Communities
 List of British Jews
List of Jewish communities in the United Kingdom

Notes and references

Further reading
Collins Dr. KE, Borowski E, and Granat L – Scotland's Jews – A Guide to the History and Community of the Jews in Scotland (2008)
 Levy, A – The Origins of Scottish Jewry
 Phillips, Abel – A History of the Origins of the First Jewish Community in Scotland: Edinburgh, 1816 (1979)
 Glasser, R – Growing Up in the Gorbals, Chatto & Windus (1986)
 Shinwell, Manny – Conflict Without Malice (1955) – autobiography
 Conn, A (editor) – Serving Their Country- Wartime Memories of Scottish Jews (2002)
 Kaplan, H L – Jewish Cemeteries in Scotland in Avotaynu, Vol.VII No 4, Winter 1991
 Ronder, Jack – The Lost Tribe, W.H. Allen (1978)

External links
 Jewish Year Book (JYB)
 
 Jewish Community of Edinburgh - Chabad on Campus
 Scottish Council of Jewish Communities
 Jewish Encyclopedia on Scotland
 Scottish Jewish Archives Centre
 Edinburgh Burgh Records, 1691
 The Virtual Jewish History Tour – Scotland
Curious Edinburgh Jewish History walking tour 
 Jewish burial ground in the Glasgow Necropolis
 Edinburgh Hebrew Congregation
 Aberdeen Hebrew Congregation
 Sukkat Shalom Edinburgh – the Edinburgh Liberal Jewish Community
 The Secret Yiddish History of Scotland

 
Jews
Gorbals
Edinburgh
History of Scotland
Social history of Scotland